Gruia may refer to several places in Romania:

Gruia, Cluj-Napoca, a district of Cluj-Napoca
Gruia, Mehedinți, a commune in Mehedinți County